Trainkos, is the national railway company of Kosovo. It was originally formed as the Kosovo Railways J.S.C UNMIK Railways from the lines of the former Yugoslav Railways that lie on Kosovar territory. In 2011, the company was split into two public companies called Trainkos and Infrakos, the latter responsible for rail maintenance.

History 

The first railway line was built under Turkish guidance for the Compagnie des Chemins de Fer Orientaux (CO), led by Maurice de Hirsch. It started in Thessaloniki, went on north to Skopje and reached Mitrovicë in 1873.

Before the First World War it was used by the Serbian Railways which operated as Yugoslav Railways between 1918 and 1992, and stopped their operations in Kosovo after the Kosovo War in 1999. In 2008 Serbian Railways restored some of its routes in Northern Kosovo region.

Rail network 

Trainkos operates  of railway in Kosovo, of which  serve both freight and passenger and  only serve freight traffic. The non-electrified network originally consisted of two lines crossing at Fushë Kosovë railway station in Fushë Kosovë: A main line going from Kraljevo in western Serbia via Mitrovicë and Fushë Kosovë to Skopje in North Macedonia, and a branch line in east-west direction from Niš in southern Serbia via Pristina railway station in the capital Pristina and Fushë Kosovë with one branch leading to Peja and the other one to Prizren. Of these lines, the one from Pristina to Peja and the one from Fushë Kosovë to North Macedonia are still served by passenger trains. Some more parts of the network are occasionally served by freight trains, like Fushë Kosovë - Obiliq; the other parts of the network are currently unused. For years, there have been plans to extend the branch to Prizren across the border to Albania, to create a link to the network of the Albanian Railways. However, these projects are no more than letters of intent.

Rail links with adjacent countries 
 Albania - no connection
 Montenegro - no connection
 North Macedonia - open
 Serbia - open in Zvečan/Lešak (though not connected to the main Trainkos network) and closed in Merdare

Recent investments in infrastructure 
Since February 2019, the government of Kosovo has taken steps to rehabilitate and upgrade rail infrastructure in the country. Particular attention is being paid to the mainline route between Hani i Elezit and Leshak which constitutes part of Pan-European Corridor X and is the backbone of the TrainKos network. Work has been split into 3 sections, beginning with the Hani i Elezit-Fushë Kosovë section (67 km), continuing with the Fushë Kosovë-Mitrovicë section (34 km) and finally being completed with the Mitrovicë-Leshak section (46 km). The works include improvements to 32 level crossings, 18 km of road, and refurbishment of the stations in Fushë Kosovë, Mitrovicë, Vushtri, Druar, Prelluzhe and Obiliq-Kastriota. Alongside construction work on the Mitrovicë-Leshak section, the third phase of modernisation also includes improvement of signalling, telecommunication, and electrification. Altogether, the modernisation of the line from the North Macedonian border to the Serbian border is €208 million. The project is expected to be complete in 2023.

Operations

Passenger traffic 
Trainkos operates three services: Local train, Freedom of Movement and InterCity. Usually, the trains consist of either two former SJ Y1 DMUs or a former NSB Di 3 with former SJ coaches. The InterCity trains usually consist of a Di 3 locomotive, one former SJ coach of Trainkos and one Macedonian coach.

Between Pristina and Peja there are two daily local train pairs, with the train staying in Peja overnight. One trip takes close to two hours.

Between Fushë Kosovë and Hani i Elezit (border of North Macedonia), there are two Freedom of Movement train pairs and one local train pair. As the only international train connection there is also the InterCity train pair (IC 891/892) from Pristina via Fushë Kosovë to Skopje and back. In direction of Fushë Kosovë, all trains stop at all stations; in the other direction the trains skip various stations, only the local train in the evening stops everywhere. The trains need close to one and a half hours for the trip from Fushë Kosovë to Hani i Elezit.

Until March 2008 there were two more Freedom of Movement train pairs from Fushë Kosovë to Leshak, but this traffic had to be discontinued until further notice due to ongoing tensions with Serbia.

Freight traffic 

National freight traffic is of importance, as it serves various industries such as calcium carbonate plants throughout the country. International freight traffic is handled via Hani i Elezit, and the container terminal is close to Pristina airport, near the Miradi station.

Incomplete list of regular freight services:
 Coal from Obilić (Kastriot) to the NewCoFerronikeli plant near Glogovac. The coal cars are pulled to Obilić station by a steam locomotive operated by the coal mine. Usually runs every second day.
 Ore trains from the Golesh mine (south-west of Pristina airport) to the NewCoFerronikeli plant. Usually daily.
 Several types of freight (containers, cisterns, bulk goods) between Hani i Elezit (from/to North Macedonia) and Miradi, serving several private sidings en route. Usually daily.

Northern Kosovo 
On 3 March 2008 (three weeks after the declaration of independence of Kosovo), the Serbian railways ŽS (successor of Yugoslav Railways) announced that they would seize control over the railway infrastructure lying in the northern part of Kosovo, including all personnel, and would resume traffic after having assured compliance to Serbian safety standards.

, ŽS (Srbija Voz) runs trains between Kraljevo and North Mitrovica. There is both freight and passenger traffic, but without border control, since Serbia considers Kosovo to be part of its own territory. This leads to the situation that, for instance, fuel is transported into Kosovo territory, without toll being paid to the Kosovarian state. The political situation prevents any train services between Zvečan and Mitrovica (the line would be in operating condition). From Mitrovicë, the line is, in principle, controlled by Kosovo Railways, but there is no regular freight or passenger traffic until Obilić (freight) or Fushë Kosovë (passengers) respectively.

On January 13, 2017 ŽS announced that North Mitrovica – Kraljevo line will be extended to run as an express train directly to Belgrade. This line would connect North Mitrovica with Belgrade via Raška, Kraljevo, Kragujevac, Lapovo and Mladenovac. This was first time since Kosovo war that direct express train service was established between Belgrade and Kosovo. A diplomatic incident ensued, which led to the train returning to Belgrade without reaching Kosovo; the direct connection to Belgrade has not been reestablished since.

Rolling stock 
The rolling stock partly stems from the former Yugoslav Railways, and was partly imported from various European countries, such as via the Kosovo Train for Life charter train that arrived in Pristina on 7 September 1999 bringing aid and rolling stock from the United Kingdom and Germany in connection with the Kosovo Force peace-keeping efforts.

Locomotives 
Five types of locomotives are in use. There are former Yugoslav diesel-electric class 661 locomotives built by General Motors, former NSB Di 3 locomotives ("NOHABs") imported from Norway (also a construction by General Motors, but built in Sweden by the NoHAB works), a single Vossloh G1700-2 BB a single General Motors JT38CW-DC built mainly from new parts using parts from 661-203 (Bogies) and 661-261 (Compressor and some ancillarys) and a single EMD GT22HW-2, a custom-designed EMD A1A-A1A diesel-electric locomotive built by Đuro Đaković for Yugoslavia. While all types of locomotives are used for freight trains, only the NoHABs and GT22HW-2 are used to pull passenger trains, usually all trains between Fushë Kosovë and Peja, and rarely trains between Fushë Kosovë and Hani i Elezit.

Diesel railcars 
Normally, all trains between Fushë Kosovë and Peja are run with former SJ class Y1 diesel railcars built by Fiat. Sometimes, the Y1 are also used on the line to Hani i Elezit. There are also some former FS class ALn 668 railcars available, but these are not needed any more since the delivery of the Y1 and are currently parked at Fushë Kosovë.

Carriages 
Both carriages from the former Yugoslav Railways as well as second-hand carriages from all over Europe are available, however many of them not in operating condition. At the moment, all locomotive hauled passenger trains use former SJ coaches and, in the case of the InterCity, one carriage of Makedonski Železnici.

Pictures

Locomotives

See also 
 Transport in Kosovo
 Yugoslav Railways

Notes and references
Notes:

References:

External links 
 Trainkos Official Website
 Infrakos Official Website
 Eisenbahn im Kosovo 1874 bis heute (Kosovo Railways Fanpage, German)

Rail transport in Kosovo
Companies of Kosovo